Route S28 may refer to:

United States
 County Route S28 (California)